András Dombai (born 17 September 1979) is a Hungarian footballer who currently plays as a goalkeeper for FC Tatabánya.

External links
 Profile

1979 births
Living people
People from Tatabánya
Hungarian footballers
Association football goalkeepers
Szombathelyi Haladás footballers
Mosonmagyaróvári TE 1904 footballers
Lombard-Pápa TFC footballers
Budafoki LC footballers
Újpest FC players
FC Tatabánya players
Nemzeti Bajnokság I players
Sportspeople from Komárom-Esztergom County
21st-century Hungarian people